Mihajlo Mitev (born August 30, 1997) is a Macedonian professional basketball Point guard who last played for MZT Skopje.

External links
 RealGM Profile
 BGBasket Profile
 Eurobasket Profile

References

1997 births
Living people
Macedonian men's basketball players
Sportspeople from Štip
Guards (basketball)
KK MZT Skopje players
KK Vardar players